Taleqan is a city in Alborz Province, Iran.

Taleqan or Taleqani may also refer to:
Taloqan, a city in Afghanistan
Taleqani, Fars, a village in Fars Province, Iran
Taleqani, Mamasani, a village in Fars Province, Iran
Taleqan, Gilan, a village in Gilan Province, Iran
Taleqani, Ilam, a village in Ilam Province, Iran
Taleqan, Isfahan, a village in Isfahan Province, Iran
Taleqan, Kerman, a village in Kerman Province, Iran
Rustai-ye Taleqani, Kerman, a village in Kerman Province, Iran
Taleqan, Lorestan, a village in Lorestan Province, Iran
Taleqan 1, a village in Lorestan Province, Iran
Taleqan 2, a village in Lorestan Province, Iran
Dangi-ye Akbarabad or Taleqani, a village in Lorestan Province, Iran
Sargrefteh or Taleqani, a village in Lorestan Province, Iran
Taleqan, West Azerbaijan, a village in West Azerbaijan Province, Iran
Taleqan County, an administrative subdivision of Alborz Province, Iran

See also 
 Talokan (disambiguation)